U Sports soccer may refer to one of the following Canadian university soccer competitions:
 U Sports men's soccer
 U Sports men's soccer championship
 U Sports women's soccer
 U Sports women's soccer championship

University and college soccer in Canada